Isla Encantada is an island in the Gulf of California east of the Baja California Peninsula. The island is uninhabited and is part of San Felipe Municipality.

Biology

Isla Encantada has only one endemic species of reptile, the Enchanted Side-blotched Lizard (Uta encantadae).

References

Islands of Baja California
Islands of the Gulf of California
Uninhabited islands of Mexico